Sarnaghbyur is a village in the Ani Municipality of the Shirak Province of Armenia.
It was renamed Sarnaghbyur in 1940.

The village has an artificial reservoir that irrigates 1,000 hectares of land in Ani.

Demographics

History 
There is also an archeological site in the village. There are numerous evidences on the hill called Kalachi or Ghalachi, but no archaeological studies have been conducted so far. Village names can be listed as Gyodikendi and Syogutli or Sogtlu names that have been given by the Turks in 1918. In May battles in the way it should be stated that the village is quite serious resistance to the Turkish barbarians 1918 on May 18-23 or 24 within the period. There are many accounts of these events. The village has a large area.

Economy 
The population is engaged in cattle breeding, cultivation of grain and fodder crops.

Historical and cultural sights 
The village has a number of historical monuments that probably indicate that the area was formerly inhabited.

In the center of the village are the churches of St. Tadevos (1883), St. Jacob (V-VI centuries) and St. Karapet ( 1205 ). Near the village are the Vogheni Monastery of the X-XIII centuries, St. Gregory the Illuminator pilgrimage site, and 6 km east - St. Lazar Church (V-VI centuries), "Gndakar" (1st millennium BC) and "Berdik" ( 2nd-1st millennium BCE) castles. In 1883, the Tadevos Apostolic Church was built, which is now in operation.

Gallery

References 

 
 World Gazeteer: Armenia – World-Gazetteer.com
 

Populated places in Shirak Province